Zen is a personal recommendations service created by Yandex that uses machine learning technology.

In September 2022, Yandex sold the service to VK.

Zen creates a feed of content that automatically adjusts to the interests of a user. The selection of content is based on the analysis of browsing history, user-specified preferences, location, time of day and other factors.

The average monthly site traffic is around 59 million people.

Technology 

Zen is an example of the implementation of a specialized artificial intelligence technology.

To analyze the interests and preferences of users, Yandex used information about sites that have been visited, as well as user-specified interests.

The system analyzes the user's favorite sites and other behaviors with the aim of creating a unique model of the user's preferences. With an increasing amount of data about the user, the system can offer the user more relevant and topical content, including content from sources unfamiliar to the user. Zen adapts to the changing interests of the user. For example, if a user begins to read about architecture, content on this subject will appear in their content feed more often.

Zen belong to the “Discovery” technology category (services and apps that use artificial intelligence to adapt to a user).

The technology that underlies Zen was adapted by Yandex and CERN for use in the Large Hadron Collider. It is used to provide in-depth analysis of the results of physics experiments taking place at the LHС.

Media platform 

In 2017, Yandex announced the launch of a platform that allows companies and independent authors to publish media content (articles, photos, videos) directly to Zen. The platform also allows popular authors to earn money by using micropayment channels and ads. 

In August 2021, the "Videos" section was launched in Zen. It contains videos up to 1 minute long created by Zen bloggers.

In 2021, the company paid out over 2 billion rubles to authors of publications.

Prior to the launch of the platform, Zen feeds consisted only of publications selected from publicly available sources.

After buying Zen, VK began to implement changes. In January 2023, the limit on uploaded videos was increased from 10 GB to 30 GB. In February 2023, users got an opportunity to withdraw money through the VK Pay service.

History 

In 1997, Yandex began research into natural language processing, machine learning and recommendation systems. In 2009, the proprietary machine learning algorithm MatrixNet was developed by Yandex, becoming one of the key components that Zen functions on.
The first Yandex service to introduce the use of recommendation technology was Yandex.Music, which was launched in September 2014. This technology was then implemented in Yandex.Market and Yandex.Radio.

In June 2015, a beta version of Zen became available. At first, the Zen content feed showed only content from the media, and the service was only available to the 5% of users of Yandex Browser on Android that had registered a Yandex account. Prior to this, Zen was available in an experimental form on the webpage zen.yandex.ru.

In the following months, other types of content were added to Zen, such as image galleries, articles, blogs, forums, videos from YouTube, etc.

In 2017, Zen launched Narratives, a special content format for mobile devices. Narrative is a set of slides with texts, photos, videos and GIFs. In January 2018, the format became available to Zen authors.

In August 2022, VK announced the purchase of Zen and Zen News. The deal was closed on September 12, 2022.

Management 

The head of the Zen service is Anton Frolov.

Finances 

The platform has ad-based business model. In September 2017, Zen's revenue amounted to 200 million rubles.
In 2020, the planned revenue amounted to 13.1 billion rubles. According to the results of the fourth quarter of 2021, the planned revenue amounted to 18.9 billion rubles.

Competitors 

After the release of Zen, several major companies also announced personal recommendation services. In May 2016, Mail.Ru Group presented a similar project called Likemore, which offers users content from VK (VKontakte) social media groups. In August 2016, Google launched a test version of a similar service Google Discover that recommends news articles. Apple and Facebook have also launched news services with similar functionality. In 2019, VK launched a similar service named "Pulse". It is assumed that VK will merge Pulse and purchased Zen.

References 

Recommender systems
Yandex